Alfred Partikel (7 October 1888 – disappeared 20 October 1945) was a German painter.

Biography 
Partikel was born in Goldap, East Prussia and grew up in Szittkehmen. He attended school in Insterburg and studied at the academy of arts in Königsberg in 1905–07. In 1908 he moved to Munich and in 1910 to Weimar to study at the Weimar school of arts.

Partikel worked in Berlin in 1911 until 1921 and served in the German Army in World War I. In 1921 he moved to Ahrenshoop on the Baltic Sea.

He became a Professor for landscape painting at the Königsberg academy of arts in 1929
and was a guest of the Villa Massimo in Rome in 1930/31. He was a member of Max Pechstein's "artist's Colony" of Nidden. His works were classified as "entartete Kunst" in 1937.

Disappearance
Partikel fled by bicycle in February 1945 from Königsberg  to Ahrenshoop and disappeared picking for mushrooms in the woods near Ahrenshoop on 20 October 1945. His remains were never found.

See also
List of people who disappeared

References 

1888 births
1940s missing person cases
20th-century German painters
20th-century German male artists
German male painters
German Army personnel of World War I
Missing people
Missing person cases in Germany
People from East Prussia
People from Gołdap
Year of death unknown
Academic staff of Kunstakademie Königsberg
German refugees
World War II refugees